Mofletta (also Mufleta, Mofleta, Moufleta etc.) is a Maghrebi Jewish pancake traditionally eaten during the Mimouna celebration, the day after Passover.

Mofletta is a thin crêpe made from water, flour and oil. The dough is rolled out thinly and cooked in a greased frying pan until it is yellow-brown in color. It is usually eaten warm, spread with butter, honey, syrup, jam, walnut, pistachios or dried fruits.

The Mimouna holiday, brought to Israel by the Jewish communities of Maghreb, notably Jews in Morocco, is celebrated immediately after Passover. In the evening, a feast of fruit, confectionery and pastries is set out for neighbors and visitors, and mofletta is one of the dishes traditionally served.

See also
Cuisine of the Mizrahi Jews
Israeli cuisine

References

External links
Recipe for Mofletta (Hebrew)
 

Israeli cuisine
Jewish baked goods
Mizrahi Jewish cuisine
Jews and Judaism in Morocco
Pancakes
North African cuisine
Sephardi Jewish cuisine